Wenceslao Carrillo Alonso-Forjador (9 October 1889 in Valladolid, Spain – 7 November 1963 in Charleroi, Belgium) was a prominent Spanish Socialist leader, father of Santiago Carrillo. He belonged to the "Caballerist" faction of the Spanish Socialist Workers' Party. He took in Casado's coup of March 1939.

References

1889 births
1963 deaths
People from Valladolid
Spanish Socialist Workers' Party politicians
Government ministers of Spain
Members of the Congress of Deputies of the Second Spanish Republic
Politicians from Castile and León
Spanish trade unionists
Spanish people of the Spanish Civil War (Republican faction)
Exiles of the Spanish Civil War in Belgium
Madrid city councillors